Mellecey is a commune in the Saône-et-Loire department in the region of Bourgogne-Franche-Comté in eastern France.

Sight
Château de Germolles

See also
Communes of the Saône-et-Loire department

References

Communes of Saône-et-Loire
Saône-et-Loire communes articles needing translation from French Wikipedia